Tachypleus is a genus of south, southeast and east Asian horseshoe crabs in the family Limulidae.

Species
There are two extant (living) species:
 Tachypleus gigas (Müller, 1785)
 Tachypleus tridentatus (Leach, 1819)

And two extinct species only known from fossil.
 Tachypleus decheni (Zincken, 1862) Upper Eocene Domsen Sands, Germany
 Tachypleus syriacus (Woodward, 1879) Upper Cretaceous (Cenomanian) Haqel and Hjoula Konservat-Lagerstatten, Lebanon

References

External links

Xiphosura
Extant Cenomanian first appearances
Chelicerate genera
Taxonomy articles created by Polbot